The Chanousia Alpine Botanical Garden (about 10,000 m2) is an alpine botanical garden located at 2170 meters altitude near Mont Blanc, at the Little St Bernard Pass, and even if it's located in France, it belongs to the Italian commune of La Thuile (Aosta Valley). It was founded by Valdostan abbot and botanist Pierre Chanoux. It is open daily in the warmer months.

The garden was first established in 1897 by Abbot Pierre Chanoux, and in its best years contained about 2500 species of mountain plants from the Alps and around the world. It was badly damaged during World War II, and restored starting in 1978. Today the garden contains about 1200 species which flourish in a short growing spell (two months) between heavy winters with snowfall ranging from 4-8 meters.

See also 
 List of botanical gardens in Italy

References 
 Giardino Botanico Alpino Chanousia, Official site 
 Chanousia, Autonomous Region of Aosta Valley] 
 Giardino Botanico Alpino "Chanousia", BGCI 

Botanical gardens in Italy
Buildings and structures in Aosta Valley
Gardens in Aosta Valley